Opperman is an unincorporated community and coal town in southwestern Guernsey County, Ohio, United States. Its post office  is closed.

History
Opperman was planted by Thomas Moore and his wife on August 28, 1903. The town flourished while the mines were being operated. The village once had a railroad station, stores, schools and homes, but nearly all have disappeared.

References

Unincorporated communities in Guernsey County, Ohio
Coal towns in Ohio
Unincorporated communities in Ohio